Tongyunmen station is a station on Line 6 of the Beijing Subway. Construction began on September 20, 2012.

This station is located in Tongzhou District, Beijing.

Currently, the station is not opened. It is scheduled to open in 2024. Line 6 trains pass through this station but do not stop.

Station Layout 
The station has an underground dual-island platform.

References

Beijing Subway stations in Tongzhou District